Jacopo Mosca (born 29 August 1993) is an Italian cyclist, who currently rides for UCI WorldTeam . In May 2018, he was named in the startlist for the Giro d'Italia. In August 2019, he was named in the startlist for the 2019 Vuelta a España.

Major results

2011
 1st Trofeo Comune di Vertova
 7th Overall Giro della Lunigiana
2014
 6th Trofeo Edil C
 9th Gran Premio Industrie del Marmo
2015
 6th 
 7th Trofeo Edil C
 8th Gran Premio Industrie del Marmo
 9th Coppa della Pace
2016
 10th Overall Tour of Britain
2017
 1st  Overall Tour of Hainan
1st Stage 7
 1st  Mountains classification, Tour de Korea
 10th Overall Tour of Qinghai Lake
2018
 1st  Points classification, Tirreno–Adriatico
 3rd Overall Tour of China I
1st Stage 4
2019
 9th Overall Szlakiem Walk Majora Hubala
 9th Overall Oberösterreich Rundfahrt
2020
 4th Memorial Marco Pantani
 4th Coppa Sabatini
 4th Giro dell'Appennino
 7th Overall Settimana Internazionale di Coppi e Bartali

Grand Tour general classification results timeline

References

External links

1993 births
Living people
Italian male cyclists
People from Savigliano
Cyclists from Piedmont
Sportspeople from the Province of Cuneo